Veriton may refer to:

Acer Veriton series, a line of Acer PCs
Veriton (record label), Polish record label